Rhys Powell was  Dean of Bangor from 1554 until 1557.

References

16th-century Welsh Anglican priests
Deans of Bangor